Petar Majstorovic  (born 5 February 1975), is K-1 WGP Light Heavyweight Champion  2017 a Swiss-Croatian heavyweight karateka and kickboxer. He is World Kickboxing Network (W.K.N.) former World Champion and two times K-1 preliminary tournaments champion in Croatia and Germany.
He trained with Andy Hug from 1992 to 2000.

Majstorović's karate record is at 45 wins and six losses out of 51 fights. His K-1 record is at 69 wins and 22 losses out of 90 fights. In 2009, he registered Petar Majstorovic K Gym as a private business in Bern.

Titles
1996 Switzerland Seidokarate Open champion
1998 WKA European Kickboxing Heavyweight champion
2000 WKN Intercontinental Thai boxing champion
2001 K-1 World Grand Prix Preliminary Germany champion
2001 W.K.N. World Kickboxing champion
2001 K-1 World Grand Prix Preliminary Germany Champion
2008 WPKC World Heavyweight champion +95 kg
2006 K-1 Fighting Network Prague Round '07 runner up
2003 K-1 Spain Grand Prix in Barcelona runner up
2002 K-1 World Grand Prix Preliminary Croatia champion
2008 World Full Contact Association (W.F.C.A.) World Super Heavyweight kickboxing champion
2013 Fight Night European Heavyweight kickboxing champion
2017 K-1 WGP Light Heavyweight Champion

Kickboxing record

|-  bgcolor="#CCFFCC"
|2017-06-10||Win||align=left| Janosch Nietlispach||K1 Andy Hug Memorial 2017||Switzerland|| Ext. R. TKO||4|| 
|-
!style=background:white colspan=9|
|-
|-  bgcolor="#CCFFCC"
|2016-06-18||Win||align=left| Stefan Leko||Swiss Las Vegas Fusion 2016||Switzerland||TKO||2||
|-
|-  bgcolor="#CCFFCC"
|2013-11-02||Win||align=left| Ibo Efe||FIGHT NIGHT BERN 2013||Urtenen-Schönbühl, Switzerland||KO||3|| 
|-
|-  bgcolor="#CCFFCC"
|2013-05-11||Win||align=left| Patrick Schmid||Fight for Glory||Zollikofen, Switzerland|| Decision || 3||3:00
|-  bgcolor="#FFBBBB"
|2009-03-14||Loss||align=left| Rico Verhoeven||Oktagon presents: It's Showtime 2009||Milan, Italy||Decision||3||3:00
|-  bgcolor="#CCFFCC"
|2008-11-15||Win||align=left| Frédéric Sinistra||||Liège, Belgium||TKO||12||2:00
|-
!style=background:white colspan=9|
|-
|-  bgcolor="#FFBBBB"
|2008-11-08||Loss||align=left| Tomáš Hron||Janus Fight Night "The Legend"||Padova, Italy||Decision||3||3:00
|-  bgcolor="#FFBBBB"
|2008-02-09||Loss||align=left| Xhavit Bajrami||||Switzerland||Decision (unanimous)||3||3:00
|-  bgcolor="#CCFFCC"
|2007-11-27||Win||align=left| Ergin Solmaz||Night of Fighters 4||Bern, Switzerland||KO||2||2:15
|-
!style=background:white colspan=9|
|-
|-  bgcolor="#FFBBBB"
|2007-09-07||Loss||align=left| Magomed Magomedov||Noc Bojovníkov||Bratislava, Slovakia|| Decision||3||3:00
|-  bgcolor="#CCFFCC"
|2007-08-19||Win||align=left| Tibor Nagy||K-1 Fighting Network Hungary 2007||Debrecen, Hungary||Decision||3||3:00
|-  bgcolor="#FFBBBB"
|2007-05-04||Loss||align=left| Errol Zimmerman||K-1 Fighting Network Romania 2007||Bucharest, Romania||Decision (Majority)||4||3:00
|-  bgcolor="#CCFFCC"
|2007-03-10||Win||align=left| Michael McDonald||K-1 Fighting Network Croatia 2007||Split, Croatia||TKO||5||3:00
|-  bgcolor="#CCFFCC"
|2007-02-17||Win||align=left| Luca Sabatini||Night of Fighters 3||Bern, Switzerland||TKO||5||0:20
|-  bgcolor="#FFBBBB"
|2006-12-16||Loss||align=left| Magomed Magomedov||K-1 Fighting Network Prague Round '07||Prague, Czech Republic||Decision||3||3:00
|-
!style=background:white colspan=9|
|-
|-  bgcolor="#CCFFCC"
|2006-12-16||Win||align=left| Humberto Evora||K-1 Fighting Network Prague Round '07||Prague, Czech Republic||Decision||3||3:00
|-  bgcolor="#CCFFCC"
|2006-12-16||Win||align=left| Daniel Jerling||K-1 Fighting Network Prague Round '07||Prague, Czech Republic||TKO||3|| 
|-  bgcolor="#FFBBBB"
|2005-05-20||Loss||align=left| Topi Helin||K-1 Scandinavia Grand Prix 2006||Stockholm, Sweden||Ext.R Decision (Split)||4||3:00
|-  bgcolor="#FFBBBB"
|2005-05-06||Loss||align=left| Vitali Akhramenko||K-1 Slovakia 2005||Bratislava, Slovakia||Decision (Unanimous)||3||3:00
|-  bgcolor="#FFBBBB"
|2005-01-20||Loss||align=left| Brice Guidon||K-1 Fighting Network 2006 in Marseilles||Marseilles, France||Decision||3||3:00
|-  bgcolor="#CCFFCC"
|2007-10-03||Win||align=left| Lloyd van Dams||Fights at the Border IV||Lommel, Belgium|| Decision||3||3:00
|-  bgcolor="#FFBBBB"
|2005-05-27||Loss||align=left| Gregory Tony||K-1 World Grand Prix 2005 in Paris||Paris, France||Decision (Unanimous)||3||3:00
|-  bgcolor="#FFBBBB"
|2005-04-16||Loss||align=left| Ionuţ Iftimoaie||K-1 Italy 2005 Oktagon||Milan, Italy||Decision||3||3:00
|-  bgcolor=#c5d2ea
|2004-12-18||Draw||align=left| Sergei Gur||K-1 MAX Spain 2004||Guadalajara, Spain||Decision||3||3:00
|-  bgcolor="#FFBBBB"
|2004-09-18||Loss||align=left| Mike Bernardo||K-1 W.K.A. Championships||Basel, Switzerland||Decision||5||3:00 
|-
!style=background:white colspan=9|
|-
|-  bgcolor="#FFBBBB"
|2004-05-30||Loss||align=left| Ewerton Teixeira||Kyokushin vs K-1 2004 All Out Battle||Tokyo, Japan||Decision (Unanimous)||3||3:00
|-  bgcolor=#c5d2ea
|2004-04-24||Draw||align=left| Sergei Gur||K-1 Italy 2004||Milan, Italy||Decision||3||3:00
|-
|-  bgcolor="#CCFFCC"
|2004-3-27||Win||align=left| Azem Maksutaj||Fight Night Winterthurn||Switzerland||Decision||5||
|-
|-  bgcolor="#FFBBBB"
|2003-12-20||Loss||align=left| Alexander Ustinov||K-1 Spain Grand Prix 2003 in Barcelona|| Barcelona, Spain||KO||3||2:28
|-
!style=background:white colspan=9|
|-
|-  bgcolor="#CCFFCC"
|2003-12-20||Win||align=left| Cyrille Diabate||K-1 Spain Grand Prix 2003 in Barcelona||Barcelona, Spain||Decision (Unanimous)||3||3:00
|-  bgcolor="#CCFFCC"
|2003-12-20||Win||align=left| Jordi Ramis||K-1 Spain Grand Prix 2003 in Barcelona||Barcelona, Spain||KO||2||1:14
|-  bgcolor="#FFBBBB"
|2003-09-12||Loss||align=left| Siniša Andrijašević||K-1 Final Fight||Split, Croatia||Decision (Split)||5||3:00
|-
|-  bgcolor="#FFBBBB"
|2003-05-20||Loss||align=left| Jerrel Venetiaan||K-1 World Grand Prix 2003 in Basel||Basel, Switzerland||Decision||3||3:00
|-  bgcolor="#FFBBBB"
|2003-03-15||Loss||align=left| Martin Holm||K-1 World Grand Prix 2003 Preliminary Scandinavia||Stockholm, Sweden||Decision||3||3:00
|-  bgcolor="#FFBBBB"
|2002-05-25||Loss||align=left| Remy Bonjasky||K-1 World Grand Prix 2002 in Paris||Paris, France||KO (Kick)||4||0:27
|-  bgcolor="#CCFFCC"
|2002-04-13||Win||align=left| Xhavit Bajrami||K-1 World Grand Prix 2002 Preliminary Croatia||Zagreb, Croatia||Ext R. Decision (Majority)||4||3:00
|-
!style=background:white colspan=9|
|-
|-  bgcolor="#CCFFCC"
|2002-04-13||Win||align=left| Sinisa Andrijasevic||K-1 World Grand Prix 2002 Preliminary Croatia||Zagreb, Croatia||Injury|||| 
|-  bgcolor="#CCFFCC"
|2002-04-13||Win||align=left| Ergin Solmaz||K-1 World Grand Prix 2002 Preliminary Croatia||Zagreb, Croatia||KO||2|| 
|-  bgcolor="#FFBBBB"
|2001-07-01||Loss||align=left| Alexey Ignashov||K-1 World Grand Prix 2001 in Nagoya||Nagoya, Japan||Decision (Unanimous)||3||3:00
|-  bgcolor="#CCFFCC"
|2001-05-20||Win||align=left| Attila Fusko||K-1 World Grand Prix 2001 Preliminary Germany||Oberhausen, Germany||TKO||1||0:40
|-
!style=background:white colspan=9|
|-
|-  bgcolor="#CCFFCC"
|2001-05-20||Win||align=left| Dimitri Alexudis||K-1 World Grand Prix 2001 Preliminary Germany||Oberhausen, Germany||KO||1||2:38
|-  bgcolor="#CCFFCC"
|2001-05-20||Win||align=left| Florian Ogunade||K-1 World Grand Prix 2001 Preliminary Germany||Oberhausen, Germany||TKO||3||1:48
|-  bgcolor="#FFBBBB"
|1999-06-05||Loss||align=left| Cyril Abidi||K-1 Fight Night '99||Zurich, Switzerland||Decision (Unanimous)||5||3:00
|-  bgcolor="#CCFFCC"
|1999-2-27||Win||align=left| Xahvit Bajrami||Fight Night Wohlen||Switzerland
|-
|-  bgcolor="#FFBBBB"
|1998-06-06||Loss||align=left| Stefan Leko||K-1 Fight Night '98 Quarter Finals||Zurich, Switzerland||Ext.R Decision||4||3:00
|-  bgcolor="#FFBBBB"
|1997-03-16||Loss||align=left| Ray Sefo||K-1 Kings '97||Yokohama, Japan||TKO (Referee Stoppage)||4||1:36
|-  bgcolor="#CCFFCC"
|1996-06-02||Win||align=left| Shingo Koyashu||K-1 Fight Night II||Zurich, Switzerland||Decision (Unanimous)||3||3:00
|-
| colspan=9 | Legend:

Doping suspension
In 2004, Majstorović was suspended for 2 years for his refusal to submit a sample at a kickboxing event in Switzerland.

See also
Seidokaikan
List of K-1 events
List of male kickboxers

References

External links
k-1.de profile

1975 births
Living people
Swiss male kickboxers
Heavyweight kickboxers
Swiss Muay Thai practitioners
Swiss male karateka
Sportspeople from Bern
Swiss people of Croatian descent
Doping cases in kickboxing